Soused herring is raw herring soaked in a mild preserving liquid. It can be raw herring in a mild vinegar pickle or Dutch brined herring.  As well as vinegar, the marinade might contain cider, wine or tea, sugar, herbs (usually bay leaf), spices (usually mace), and chopped onion.

The word 'soused' can also describe a marinated herring that has been cooked. The herring is usually baked in the (vinegar) marinade (but can be fried and then soaked in the marinade). It is served cold. This is usual in Scotland, Wales and Ireland.

The soused herring (maatjesharing or just maatjes in Dutch, or Matjes/matjes in German and Swedish respectively) is an especially mild salt herring, which is made from young immature herrings. The herrings are ripened for a couple of days in oak barrels in a salty solution, or brine. The pancreatic enzymes which support the ripening make this version of salt herring especially mild and soft. Raw herring pickled in vinegar are called rollmops.

As of 2015, within the EU, Dutch made Hollandse Nieuwe, Holländischer Matjes and Hollandse maatjesharing have TSG Certification and German produced Glückstädter Matjes, produced in Schleswig-Holstein has PGI certification. As a pickled herring it can form one course of the traditional twelve-dish Christmas Eve supper in Poland.

History
This process of preparing herring (known as "gibbing") was developed in the Middle Ages by the Dutch. Herrings are caught between the end of May and the beginning of July in the North Sea near Denmark or Norway, before the breeding season starts. This is because herrings at this time are unusually rich in oils (over 15%) and their roe and milt have not started to develop.

The brine used for Dutch soused herring has a much lower salt content and is much milder in taste than the German Loggermatjes. To protect against infection by nematodes of the genus Anisakis, European Union regulations state that fish should be frozen at −20 °C for at least 24 hours. In the modern day, soused herrings can therefore be produced throughout the year.

Preparation
Through a cut in the throat, the gills and part of the gullet are removed from the herring, eliminating any bitter taste. The liver and pancreas are left in the fish during the salt-curing process because they release enzymes essential for flavor. The herrings are then placed in the brine for approximately 5 days, traditionally in oak casks. They require no further preparation after fillet and skin removal and can be eaten as a snack with finely sliced raw onion and pickles.

As skin removal requires experience, fillets or double fillets should be attempted first. The soused herrings are silvery outside and pink inside when fresh, and should not be bought if they appear grey and oily.

Whereas salt herrings have a salt content of 20% and must be soaked in water before consumption, soused herrings do not need soaking.

Serving

In the Netherlands soused herring is most often served as a snack, most frequently plain, or with cut onions. Whole herring is often eaten by lifting the herring by its tail and eating it upwards holding it over the mouth.
Soused herring dishes in Northern Germany are traditionally served with potatoes boiled in their skins, French beans, finely sliced fried bacon and onions. It is also common in Germany to eat soused herring with sliced raw onions in a bread roll, in a dish called Matjesbrötchen.

In some regions (e. g. Holstein), it is served on dark bread with a cowberry and cream sauce. Soused herring can also be served with cream or yogurt sauces containing onions and gherkins, or in salads.

In Sweden matjessill is traditionally served with boiled potatoes, sour cream, chopped chives, crisp bread and snaps. Boiled eggs are popular together with this dish that is most traditionally served on Midsummer's Eve - Finland has a similar custom but silli is not associated with crisp bread. Nowadays most Swedes and Finns eat herring which comes in cans and are sliced and with added sugar. The Swedish matjessill is most often more strongly spiced than other varieties.

See also
 Pickled herring
 Fischbrötchen
 Gwamegi
 Schmaltz herring
 Rollmops
 Sashimi

References

Herring dishes
Snack foods
Dutch cuisine
German cuisine
Swedish cuisine